Fars or Al-Montabaato fi-l-Fars is an Iranian newspaper in Fars region. The concessionaire of this magazine was Mirza Taghi-Khan Kashani and it was published in Shiraz since 1872. This was the first modern newspaper which was published in southern Iran.

See also
List of magazines and newspapers of Fars

References

Publications established in 1872
Newspapers published in Fars Province
Mass media in Fars Province
1872 establishments in Iran
Newspapers published in Qajar Iran